The third season of Cold Case, an American television series, began airing on September 25, 2005, and concluded on May 21, 2006. Season three regular cast members include Kathryn Morris, Danny Pino, John Finn, Thom Barry and Jeremy Ratchford. From episode 8 onwards, Tracie Thoms joins the main cast as Det. Kat Miller.

Cast

Episodes

References

2005 American television seasons
2006 American television seasons
Cold Case seasons